Aagot was a three-masted square rig sailing ship built by Dobie & Company, Govan for the Firth Line, as Firth of Clyde and was launched on 1 June 1882. She was wrecked on Wardang Island on 11 October 1907.

See also
List of shipwrecks of Australia

References

1882 ships
Ships built on the River Clyde
Shipwrecks of South Australia
Maritime incidents in 1907